The Saint Mary's Church in St Fagans is a medieval church located in Cardiff, south Wales. Built in the 12th century it underwent extensive and sympathetic restoration in 1859, undertaken by G. E. Street in 1859. The Church of St Mary was listed as a Grade II* building on 28 January 1963.

History
The church of St Mary's has its origins in the 12th century, with its first rector recorded in 1301. The church underwent major alterations in the 14th century and a porch and new roof were added in the 15th century. The tower was rebuilt in the 1600s and repaired and heightened in 1730. In 1859 G. E. Street began extensive restoration and added a vestry and north aisle, paid for by Baroness Windsor. The church was listed as a Grade II* building on 28 January 1963, citied as being 'highly graded as a medieval fabric with interesting Victorian additions and restorations by G E Street'.

Architecture 
The church is built of local rubblestone with Welsh slate roofs. The later tower is built of coursed and roughly squared stone, with dressed quoins.

Footnotes

Primary sources
 

Grade II* listed churches in Cardiff
Church in Wales church buildings
12th-century church buildings in Wales
Saint Mary